The first season of The Secret Life of the American Teenager, an American television series created by Brenda Hampton, debuted on the ABC Family television network on July 1, 2008. The first season comprises 23 episodes, the first eleven of which ended on September 9, 2008. Despite marketing issues, the remaining twelve ended up as part of the first season, which concluded its initial airing on March 23, 2009. Season one regular cast members include Shailene Woodley, Molly Ringwald, Daren Kagasoff, Kenny Baumann, Francia Raisa, Megan Park, India Eisley, Greg Finley II, Jorge Pallo, Mark Derwin, and Luke Zimmerman.

Kyle XY was ABC Family's highest rated original series from June 2006 - July 2016, but lost its reign when the series premiere of The Secret Life of the American Teenager brought in 2.8 million viewers. The season finale brought in 4.50 million viewers, 2.4 million of whom were females. The show was the number one scripted telecast on March 23, 2009 in viewers 12-34 and the number one telecast that night in viewers.

The season focuses on the relationships between families and friends dealing with the unexpected teen pregnancy of character Amy Juergens, portrayed by Shailene Woodley. Probably the last girl anyone would expect to suffer such a scandalous event, Amy's world begins to expand as she discovers that virtually every student at her high school deals with some secret or unexpected problems, from the religious good-girl Grace to the tough-kid Ricky and to clingy loving Ben.

Main cast

 Shailene Woodley as Amy Juergens
 Kenny Baumann as Ben Boykewich
 Mark Derwin as George Juergens
 India Eisley as Ashley Juergens
 Greg Finley as Jack Pappas
 Daren Kagasoff as Ricky Underwood
 Jorge-Luis Pallo as Marc Molina
 Megan Park as Grace Bowman
 Francia Raisa as Adrian Lee
 Molly Ringwald as Anne Juergens

Episodes

<onlyinclude>{{Episode table |background=#539AE1 |overall=3 |season=3 |title=24 |director=17 |writer=20 |airdate=15 |country=U.S. |viewers=10 |episodes=

{{Episode list/sublist|The Secret Life of the American Teenager (season 1)
 |EpisodeNumber = 14
 |EpisodeNumber2 = 14
 |Title = The Father and the Son
 |WrittenBy = Brenda Hampton
 |DirectedBy = Keith Truesdell
 |OriginalAirDate =  
 |Viewers = 3.91 
 |ShortSummary = Ashley enlists the help of Reverend Stone (Tom Virtue) to ensure that her parents will stay together. Ricky's estranged father, Bob (MADtv'''s Bryan Callen), returns to town on parole in search of his son. He pays a visit to Amy and her family and later threatens Ricky with the possibility of giving the baby up for adoption. Amy reveals to her parents that Ricky has been sexually abused by his father and Anne suggests that they should seriously consider what's best for the baby-–adoption. Amy seriously considers this option and discusses it with Ben and Ricky, who both want her to keep the baby, but for very different reasons. Anne seeks out the advice of Reverend Stone to see if he knows any nice families who are looking to adopt.
 |LineColor = 539AE1
}}

}}</onlyinclude>

Reception
The series received a mixed reception when it began broadcasting. Many mainstream critics praised the messages presented in the series, although it was also criticized for its direction and writing. New York Post praised the series for having a set of characters that are "...real and come from families of all stripes — from intact to single-parent households to one boy in foster care..." The pilot episode broke the record for highest rated debut for ABC Family, beating Kyle XY, with 2.82 million viewers. The season one finale brought in 4.50 million viewers, beating the night's 90210'' which had almost half its usual number of viewers.

References

External links
Official website

2008 American television seasons
2009 American television seasons
1